Phillip Phan is Alonzo and Virginia Decker Professor of Strategy and Entrepreneurship at the Carey Business School, Johns Hopkins University, with expertise in the areas of strategy and entrepreneurship. Phan's research examines corporate governance, entrepreneurship and technology transfer, regional economic development, and innovation management in healthcare. He is currently Editor-in-Chief of Academy of Management Perspectives.

Career 
Phillip Phan earned his BBA from University of Hawaii at Manoa in 1984 and PhD in strategic management from the Foster School of Business of University of Washington in 1992, with Charles W.L. Hill as his dissertation chair. Prior to joining Johns Hopkins University in 2008, Phan served as Warren H. Bruggeman ’46 and Pauline Urban Bruggeman Distinguished Professor at Lally School of Management, Rensselaer Polytechnic Institute. He was also a Tommie Goh Distinguished Visiting Professor of Entrepreneurship and Business at Singapore Management University.

At Johns Hopkins University, Phan is Alonzo and Virginia Decker Professor of Strategy and Entrepreneurship. He also holds joint faculty appointments in the Johns Hopkins School of Medicine and Whiting School of Engineering. Between 2011 and 2012, he served as the Interim Dean of Carey Business School. He also served as the Carey Business School's Senior Executive Vice Dean between 2010 and 2015, and Vice Dean for Faculty and Research between 2008 and 2009.

Academic work 
Phan is known for his work in corporate governance, entrepreneurship and technology transfer, regional economic development, and innovation management in healthcare. He is among the most cited scholars on the subject of science parks and technology entrepreneurship. His work has found applications in a wide range of industries, most notably in healthcare. He has published over 100 peer-reviewed articles and is an author (or coauthor) of nine books.

Phan is currently Editor-in-Chief of Academy of Management Perspectives, Academic Editor of Medicine (non-clinical medicine section), and Associate Editor of Journal of Technology Transfer.

Publications

Highly cited articles 
According to Google Scholar, Phan's 10 most widely cited papers are:

Books

References 

Academic staff of Singapore Management University
Management scientists
Johns Hopkins University faculty
Rensselaer Polytechnic Institute faculty
American social scientists
Living people
Year of birth missing (living people)